The 2021 Asian Taekwondo Olympic Qualification Tournament for the Tokyo Olympic Games took place in Amman, Jordan. The tournament was held from May 21-22, 2021. Each country may enter a maximum of 2 male and 2 female divisions with only one athlete in each division. The winner and runner-up athletes per division qualify for the Olympic Games under their NOC.

Qualification summary

Results

Men

−58 kg
22 May

−68 kg
21 May

−80 kg
21 May

+80 kg
22 May

Women

−49 kg
21 May

−57 kg
22 May

−67 kg
21 May

+67 kg
22 May

References

 1st Day Results
 2nd Day Results

External links
 World Taekwondo Federation

Olympic Qualification
Taekwondo qualification for the 2020 Summer Olympics
Asian Taekwondo Olympic Qualification Tournament
Asian Taekwondo Olympic Qualification Tournament
Sports competitions in Amman